Night and Day is a 1946 American biographical and musical film starring Cary Grant, in a fictionalized account of the life of American composer and songwriter Cole Porter.

The movie was directed by Michael Curtiz and produced by Arthur Schwartz, with Jack L. Warner as executive producer. The screenplay was written by Charles Hoffman, Leo Townsend and William Bowers.

The music score by Ray Heindorf and Max Steiner was nominated for an Academy Award. The film features several of the best-known Porter songs, including the title song "Night and Day," "Begin the Beguine," and "My Heart Belongs to Daddy."

Alexis Smith plays Linda Lee Porter, Porter's wife of 35 years. Monty Woolley and Mary Martin appear as themselves.

Production 
Jack Warner paid $300,000 for the rights to Cole Porter's best known songs, and viewed the film as a "big-budget extravaganza" that would celebrate Warner Brothers' twenty years in sound films.  The scriptwriters knew that the film would need to be fictionalized, because he lacked the "rags to riches" quality common to subjects of biographical films, and was gay. Depictions of homosexuality were prohibited by film industry's Production Code.

Warner paid Grant $100,000 and bought out his contract at Columbia Pictures at a considerably greater sum. Grant and Curtiz clashed often, with much of the fighting over a script Grant viewed as weak, with "lousy characterizations." Much of the script was rewritten at his behest. Grant sometimes refused to act in scenes that he felt were poorly written, and was critical of other aspects of production. He later recalled that Curtiz lost his temper so much that the director sometimes lost his train of thought.

Grant sings several of the songs, which made Night and Day the closest he came to making a musical after the end of his stage career. He was described by his biographer as a "competent though not a very expressive singer."

Production of the film was impeded by a 1945 strike of the Conference of Studio Workers, who represented film set builders.

Cast

Plot summary 
The film is an almost entirely fictionalized version of the life of Cole Porter from his college days at Yale University, where he is studying law at the encouragement of his grandfather. One of his law professors, Monty Woolley, playing himself, encourages his song-writing. (In fact, Woolley was a classmate of Porter.)

Porter abandons study of law and Woolley leaves Yale as well. Porter's songwriting is interrupted by French Foreign Legion service in the First World War, in which he is wounded. He resumes music after the war, and weds Linda, a longtime family friend. Their marriage suffers due to Porter's dedication to his songwriting, which leaves him little time for a personal life.

At the height of his career, after many successes, Porter suffers a serious accident while horseback riding, fracturing both his legs and remaining crippled. Despite many operations he cannot walk without assistance. In the end, he reunites with Linda, who had left him.

Unsurprisingly, the film completely omits any mention of Porter's homosexuality.

Reception 
In a review upon release of the film, Thomas Pyror of The New York Times called the film "a generally pleasant and musically exciting show." The Times praised the musical numbers and the performances by Grant and Woolley, but noted the straying from historical fact and the thin and conventional scenario the scenarists concocted about the fabulous Mr. Porter." In 2004, at the debut of another film on Porter's life, De-Lovely, the Times called Night and Day "so-bad-it's-almost-good." The newspaper recounted that when Night and Day was being filmed, "Orson Welles cracked: 'What will they use for a climax? The only suspense is: will he or won't he accumulate $10 million?'"

Musical numbers

 "I'm in Love Again" – sung and danced by Jane Wyman
 "Bulldog, Bulldog" – sung by Cary Grant and male chorus
 "In the Still of the Night" – sung by Dorothy Malone (dubbed by Bobbie Canvin) and chorus
 "Old Fashioned Garden" – sung by Cary Grant and Selena Royle
 "You've Got That Thing" – sung by Paula Drew, Pat Clark and Jane Harker
 "Let's Do It, Let's Fall in Love" – sung by Jane Wyman
 "You Do Something to Me" – sung and danced by Jane Wyman and chorus
 "I'm Unlucky at Gambling" – sung by Eve Arden
 "Miss Otis Regrets" – sung by Monty Woolley (as himself)
 "I Wonder What's Become of Sally" – sung by Ginny Simms
  "What Is This Thing Called Love?" – sung by Ginny Simms
 "I've Got You Under My Skin" – sung by Ginny Simms and danced by Adam Di Gatano and Jane Di Gatano
 "Rosalie" – sung by chorus 
 "Night and Day" – sung by Bill Days
 "Just One of Those Things" – sung by Ginny Simms and danced by Estelle Sloan with chorus
 "You're the Top" – sung by Ginny Simms and Cary Grant
 "I Get a Kick Out of You" – sung by Ginny Simms and danced by chorus
 "Easy to Love" – sung by chorus
 "My Heart Belongs to Daddy" – sung by Mary Martin (as herself, the original 1938 Broadway performer) and chorus
 "Do I Love You?" – a few lines, by "rehearsing" background singer
 "Don't Fence Me In" – a few lines, in short clip from 1944 movie Hollywood Canteen, sung by Roy Rogers
 "Begin the Beguine" – sung by Carlos Ramírez and danced by George Zoritch and Milada Mladova with chorus
 "Bulldog, Bulldog" (reprise) – sung by chorus
 "Night and Day" (reprise) – sung by chorus

Box office
The film was a hit, earning theatrical rentals of $4,990,000 domestically and $2,428,000 in foreign markets.

References

External links
 
 
 
 
 
 Historic reviews, photo gallery at CaryGrant.net

1946 films
American biographical films
Biographical films about musicians
Films about musical theatre
Films about composers
Films scored by Max Steiner
Films scored by Ray Heindorf
Films scored by Cole Porter
Films directed by Michael Curtiz
Warner Bros. films
American romantic musical films
Films set in Connecticut
Films set in London
1940s biographical films
Cultural depictions of Cole Porter
1940s romantic musical films
1940s English-language films
1940s American films